The Public Health Act 1875 (c 55) is an Act of the Parliament of the United Kingdom, one of the Public Health Acts, and a significant step in the advancement of public health in England.

Its purpose was to codify previous measures aimed at combating filthy urban living conditions, which caused various health threats, including the spread of many diseases such as cholera and typhus.

Background
Reformers had from the 1830s wanted to resolve sanitary problems in urban areas, because sewage was flowing down the street daily, including the presence of sewage in living quarters.  In 1848 their efforts led to the establishment of a three-man Board of Health – if one with very limited powers.  Many factors delayed effective implementation of reform, however, such as the fact that to perform a cleanup would cost money, and neither government, factory owners, or local authorities were keen to pay.  Gradually, however, reformers helped to counteract the laissez-faire attitude of the government and public. In 1871, the Board of Health was subsumed into the Local Government Board by the Liberal Party; and when the Conservatives came to power in 1874, they were committed by Disraeli to extending social reform.  A public health Act was introduced in 1875. Home Secretary Richard Cross was responsible for drafting the legislation, and received much good will from trades union groups in the consequent years for "humanising the toil of the working man".   Disraeli ensured the passing of the 1875 Act; and when mocked by his opponents for neglecting more important political reforms, retorted on them with the resounding phrase ‘”sanitas sanitatum, omnia sanitas” [Health above Everything].

Scope of the Act
The Act made it compulsory for local powers to:
 purchase, repair or create sewers
 control water-supplies
 regulate cellars and lodging houses
 establish by-laws for controlling new streets and buildings.

With the rapid urbanisation that accompanied the Industrial Revolution, huge swathes of terraced houses had been built to accommodate the factory workers. The contrast between the housing stock built before the passage of the Act and that built after it was stark.
The Act required all new residential construction to include running water and an internal drainage system, and also led to the government prohibiting the construction of shoddy housing by building contractors.

The Act also meant that every public health authority had to have a medical officer and a sanitary inspector, to ensure the laws on food, housing, water and hygiene were carried out; and that towns had to have pavements and street lighting.

It is, however, important to realise that the new powers provided were permissive, not compulsory: they provided a model of best practice for municipalities, but actual implementation remained for the most part up to the individual local authority.

See also
Health of Towns Association
Municipal socialism
Sanitary district

References 
Halsbury's Statutes. Third Edition. Volume 26. Page 38.
Thomas Whiteside Hime. Public Health: The Practical Guide to the Public Health Act, 1875, and Correlated Acts, for the Use of Medical Officers of Health and Inspectors of Nuisances. Bailliere, Tindall and Cox. 1884. Internet Archive.
William Cunningham Glen and Alexander Glen. The Public Health Act, 1875, and the Law relating to Public Health, Local Government, and Urban and Rural Sanitary Authorities. Eighth Edition. Butterworths. Knight & Co. London. 1876. Internet Archive.
James C Stevens. The Public Health Act 1875: Arranged in a Dictionary Index Form. Shaw and Sons. London. 1876. Internet Archive.
Robert Rawlinson. The Public Health Act 1875: Suggestions as to the Preparation of District Maps, and of Plans for the Main Sewerage, Drainage, and Water Supply (Revised to 1878). HMSO. London. 1878. Internet Archive (the description of this book, on that webpage, as another work by William Glen is erroneous).
 World History 4th Edition by William J. Duiker and Jackson J. Spielvogel

External links
Text of the statute as originally enacted (PDF)
 

United Kingdom Acts of Parliament 1875
Transport policy in the United Kingdom
Urban society in the United Kingdom
Health law in the United Kingdom
Water supply and sanitation in the United Kingdom